Russia has a  border with Abkhazia, a breakaway region of Georgia. Notably, there was a dispute between the two parties over a tract of land  in size near the resort town of Krasnaya Polyana that flared in the lead-up to the Sochi Olympics. The dispute has since been dropped. Georgia considers any attempt to demarcate a boundary between the breakaway region and Russia as illigetimate.

References

Abkhazia–Russia relations
Borders of Russia